Nazarovo (Nazar) is a rural locality (a village) in Novochebenkinsky Selsoviet, Zianchurinsky District, Bashkortostan, Russia. The population was 69 as of 2010. There are 2 streets.

Geography 
Nazarovo is located 31 km northwest of Isyangulovo (the district's administrative centre) by road. Novonikolayevka is the nearest rural locality.

References 

Rural localities in Zianchurinsky District